Haploporus may refer to:
 Haploporus (flatworm), a flatworm genus in the family Haploporidae
 Haploporus (fungus), a fungus genus in the family Polyporaceae